Duel Personalities is a 1939 Our Gang short comedy film directed by George Sidney.  It was the 177th Our Gang short (178th episode, 89th talking short, 90th talking episode, and 9th MGM produced episode) that was released.

Plot
Upset that his youthful sweetheart Darla has once again thrown him over in favor of neighborhood bully Butch, Alfalfa tries to forget his troubles by watching the free performance by Professor William Delmore, a famed hypnotist. Chosen as a subject, Alfalfa is hypnotized into believing that he is the fearless D'Artagnan, of Three Musketeers. Before Professor Delmore can remove the hypnotic suggestion, he is knocked unconscious. Armed with this bold new personality, Alfalfa not only sweeps Darla off her feet, but also challenges the dumbfounded Butch (Rochefort) to a duel. But between the time of the challenge to the actual duel, a couple of things happen which could change the entire complexity of the duel itself.

Cast

The Gang
 Carl Switzer - Alfalfa
 Darla Hood - Darla
 Eugene Lee - Porky
 George McFarland - Spanky
 Billie Thomas - Buckwheat

Additional cast
 Tommy Bond as Butch
 Shirley Coates as  Muggsy
 Darwood Kaye as Waldo
 Sidney Kibrick as The Woim
 John Davidson as Professor William Delmere, hypnotist
 Phillip Terry as Professor's assistant
 Winstead Weaver as Assistant
 Lester Dorr as Onlooker
 Mary Milford as Onlooker
 Becky Bohanon as Extra
 Priscilla Lyon as Extra
 Allan Randall as Extra
 Jo-Jo La Savio as Extra
 Ruth Tobey as Extra

See also
 Our Gang filmography

References

External links

1939 films
American black-and-white films
Films directed by George Sidney
Metro-Goldwyn-Mayer short films
1939 comedy films
Our Gang films
1939 short films
1930s American films